Joseph Pereira (born 27 June) is an Indian football player who plays for Sporting Clube de Goa as a forward.

Career statistics

Club
Statistics accurate as of 11 May 2013

External links
 http://goal.com/en-india/people/india/25976/joseph-pereira

1982 births
Living people
Indian footballers
I-League players
Footballers from Goa
Sporting Clube de Goa players
Association football forwards